Donald R. "Bud" Hover (born December 13, 1954) is an American farmer, politician, and former football linebacker in the National Football League. He played college football at Washington State University, was selected in the eighth round of the 1978 NFL Draft, and played two seasons in the NFL.

Early life and education 
Born in Seattle, Washington, and raised in the east suburb of Issaquah, Washington, Hover graduated from Issaquah High School in 1973. He earned a Bachelor of Science degree in agriculture education, forest, and range management from Washington State University and a master's degree in public administration from the University of Washington.

Career 
A member of the Republican Party, Hover served two terms as commissioner of Okanogan County, Washington. In 2012, he lost re-election by ten votes. Governor Jay Inslee, a Democrat, then appointed Hover to serve as director of the Washington State Department of Agriculture. Hover resigned as agriculture director in 2015.

References

External links

1954 births
Living people
American football linebackers
Players of American football from Seattle
Washington State Cougars football players
Washington Redskins players
People from Okanogan County, Washington
County commissioners in Washington (state)
State cabinet secretaries of Washington (state)